Robbie Diver (born 19 September 1974) is a New Zealand cricketer. He played in two first-class and three List A matches for Northern Districts from 1997 to 1999.

See also
 List of Northern Districts representative cricketers

References

External links
 

1974 births
Living people
New Zealand cricketers
Northern Districts cricketers
Cricketers from Auckland